Michalis Fani  (born February 4, 1981) is a Cypriot former footballer who played as a goalkeeper.

Career
Fani started his career from Apollon Limassol. Although, he wasn't given many chances to play in the first team. So he was moved on loan to Greek side Proodeftiki F.C. When he returned from Greece, he signed a 1-year contract with the second division's team ASIL Lysi. The following season, he was transferred to APOP Kinyras Peyias FC where he was the main goalkeeper in the European games against SK Rapid Wien for UEFA Europa League.

External links

1981 births
Living people
Cypriot footballers
Association football goalkeepers
Cypriot expatriate footballers
Apollon Limassol FC players
Proodeftiki F.C. players
ASIL Lysi players
APOP Kinyras FC players
Expatriate footballers in Greece